PJ Raval is a queer first-generation Filipino-American filmmaker known for his documentary films about underrepresented subcultures and identities within the LGBTQ+ community. Raval is a Guggenheim Fellow, a Robert Giard Fellow, a member of the Producers Guild of America, and the Academy of Motion Picture Art and Sciences. Raval was named one of Filmmakers 25 New Faces of Independent Film in 2006 and was a featured creator in the 2010 Out 100. Today, he lives in Texas and is an associate professor of the Department of Radio-Television-Film at the Moody College of Communication in the University of Texas at Austin.

Early life
PJ Raval was born on April 15, 1974, in Princeton, New Jersey, but was raised in Clovis, California. Raval lived in San Diego for 10 years, then obtained an MFA in Film and Media Production at the University of Texas at Austin.

Career
In 2008, PJ Raval co-directed the documentary film TRINIDAD: Transgender Frontier with Jay Hodges. TRINIDAD focuses on Dr. Marci Bowers and two of her patients undergoing sex reassignment surgery in Trinidad, Colorado.

Raval's 2013 documentary Before You Know It focuses on the different narratives of three gay seniors. He was inspired to create the work after meeting a group of gay retirees at a screening of TRINIDAD at the Hudson Valley LGBTQ Community Center.

Raval is the director of CALL HER GANDA, a 2018 feature documentary about Jennifer Laude, a Filipina transgender woman from the city of Olongapo murdered by a 19-year-old US marine. The film addresses the topic of transphobia and how transgender individuals are being targeted and eliminated by the Catholic Church and organized religion. In addition to Laude's murder case, the film confronts issues with imperialism, poverty, and the tense relationship between the United States and the Philippines.

Raval centers community voices, including those of activist attorney Virgie Suarez, transgender journalist Meredith Talusan, and Julita Jaude, Jennifer Laude's mother. The film has received dozens of awards and nominations, including winning documentary categories at the 2019 Boston LGBT Film Festival, the 2019 Houston Asian American Pacific Islander Film Festival, the 2018 Inside Out Toronto LGBT Film Festival, 2018 L.A. Outfest, the 2018 New Delhi Film Festival, and the 2020 NLGJA: The Association of LGBTQ Journalists Excellence in Documentary Awards. The production was supported by the Ford Foundation, Arcus, Bertha Foundation, Sundance Film Institute, Fork Films, and the Tribeca Film Institute.

Raval's short films have won many awards, including “Best Narrative Short” at the Chicago Gay and Lesbian Int’l Film Festival, “Best Screenplay” at the Cinematexas Int’l Film Festival, the “Betty Nowlin Award for Excellence in Filmmaking”, and the “Director’s Visionary Award” at the Santa Cruz Film Festival. Raval has also directed music videos for various musical performers and bands, including Wild Beasts, The Sword, and Mistress Stephanie & Her Melodic Cat.

Raval is an associate professor at the Moody College of Communication in the University of Texas at Austin.

Filmography

Features

Television work

References

External links
 
 

American cinematographers
American film directors
English-language film directors
Living people
1974 births